The Bahamas competed at the 1996 Summer Olympics in Atlanta, United States.

Medalists

Athletics

Men
Track & road events

Field events

Women
Track & road events

Field events

Sailing

Open

Swimming

Men

Tennis

See also
Bahamas at the 1995 Pan American Games
Bahamas at the 1998 Central American and Caribbean Games

References

Official Olympic Reports
International Olympic Committee results database
sports-reference

Nations at the 1996 Summer Olympics
1996
Olympics